Charles IV of Alençon (2 September 1489 in Alençon – 11 April 1525 in Lyon) was the son of René of Alençon and Margaret of Vaudémont.

He succeeded his father in 1492 as Duke of Alençon and Count of Perche, and was also Count of Armagnac, Fézensac, Viscount of Rodez, Count of Fezensaguet, l'Isle-Jourdain, and Perdiac.

In 1509 he married Margaret of Angoulême, sister to Francis, Duke of Valois, who would in 1515 become King Francis I of France. Their marriage was childless: his wife was allowed to retain most of his titles.

As first prince of the blood, Charles was a prominent figure in the early part of his brother-in-law's reign. Made governor of Normandy, Charles fought at Marignano in 1515, and in 1521 defended Champagne against an imperial invasion.  He accompanied his brother-in-law, King Frances I of France, on his second expedition to Italy in 1525, and after the disaster at Pavia, took command of the defeated French forces, leading them in retreat back to French territory.  He was made a scapegoat for the defeat and accused of abandoning the king, and died soon after.  Although Charles had a sister, Françoise, who survived him, his widow took possession of his lands after his death.

Ancestors

References

Sources
107

1489 births
1525 deaths
House of Valois-Alençon
104
Counts of Perche
Counts of Armagnac
Counts of Fézensac
Counts of Fezensaguet
Counts of Isle-Jourdain
Counts of Perdiac
Viscounts of Rodez
People from Alençon
Heirs presumptive to the French throne
Military leaders of the Italian Wars
15th-century peers of France
16th-century peers of France